Spenser is an alternative spelling of the British surname Spencer. It may refer to:

Geographical places with the name Spenser:
 Spenser Mountains, a range in the northern part of South Island, New Zealand

People with the surname Spenser:
 David Spenser (1934–2013), British actor
 Edmund Spenser (c. 1552–1599), English poet
 John Spenser (1559–1614), president of Corpus Christi College, Oxford

People with the given name Spenser:
 Spenser St. John (19th century), British diplomat
 Spenser Wilkinson (1853–1937), British military writer
 Spenser Cohen, American screenwriter

In popular culture:
 Spenser (character), a fictional private investigator
 Spenser: For Hire, a mystery television series about this character
 Spenser: Small Vices, a television film about this character
 Spenser Confidential, a television film from 2020

See also
Spencer (disambiguation)
Spencer (surname)

Occupational surnames